Pouteria putamen-ovi is a species of plant in the family Sapotaceae. It is found in Brazil and Peru.

References

putamen-ovi
Vulnerable plants
Trees of Peru
Taxonomy articles created by Polbot